is a locality in  town of Pulwama district in Jammu and Kashmir. It is located 14 km towards east from Pulwama.

References 

Villages in Pulwama district